Sir Robert Beachcroft  (1650–1721) was a London cloth merchant who was Lord Mayor of London in 1711.

Beachcroft was the son of Daniel Beachcroft, a yeoman farmer of Derby, and his wife Mary Fox and was baptised at All Saints Church, Derby on 28 April 1650.  In September 1668  he was apprenticed to Thomas Palfreyman, a clothworker in London. He became a Freeman of the Clothworkers Company on 5 October 1675. He set up in business and at some time was a Blackwell Hall factor, dealing in cloth from provincial manufacturers.  Having acquired considerable wealth, he purchased More Hall, the former home of Sir Thomas More.
 
Beachcroft was a Common Councillor for the Tower  from 1699 to 1701 and was Master of the Clothworkers and Sheriff of London for the year 1700 to 1701.  He was knighted on 24 October 1700.  He was elected Alderman for Lime Street on 18 March 1703. From 1707 to 1710, he was a Colonel of the Green Regiment  of the City militia.   He was a Director of the South Sea Company from 1711 to 1712 and was Lord Mayor from 1711 to 1712. From 1714 he was living at Lea Hall Leyton.

Beachcroft married Margaret Perry, a widow, on 17 January 1706. He was a liberal benefactor to Christ's-church and St. Thomas's hospitals. Beachcroft died on 27 May 1721 aged 72 and was buried at St Mary's Church Leyton on 7 June. He had no children and his estate went to a nephew. Margaret Lady Beachcroft died on 15 December 1727.

References

External links
National Trust  Sir Robert Beachcroft (d.1721)

1650 births
1721 deaths
18th-century lord mayors of London
Sheriffs of the City of London